Bank Otsar HaHayal is an Israeli bank.

History
Otsar HaHayal was founded in 1946 by the British mandatory authorities  to provide banking services to Jewish veterans of the British armed forces. It later provided these services to Israel Defense Forces veterans and defense sector employees, who also became part owners of the bank.

In 1972, the bank opened up to the general public, although it still largely kept its association with military assets. It was purchased by Bank Hapoalim in 1977. By 1996, Otsar HaHayal completely transformed into a commercial public bank.

On January 24, 2006, Bank Hapoalim's share of the bank, 66%, was sold for 703 million NIS, approximately 185% of Otsar Ha-Hayal's estimated worth, to the First International Bank of Israel.

Criticism

Involvement in Israeli settlements

On 12 February 2020, the United Nations published a database of companies doing business related in the West Bank, including East Jerusalem, as well as in the Golan Heights. Bank Otsar Ha-Hayal was listed on the database on account of its activities in Israeli settlements in these territories.

See also

Economy of Israel
Banking in Israel

References

External links
 

Otsar HaHayal